"Peach!!/Heart of Xmas" is the thirteenth single by Japanese artist Masaharu Fukuyama. It was released on November 5, 1998. It reached #4 on the Oricon chart.

Track listing

Charts

References

1998 singles
Masaharu Fukuyama songs
Japanese television drama theme songs